A haveli is a traditional townhouse, mansion, manor house, in the Indian subcontinent, usually one with historical and architectural significance, and located in a town or city. Haveli Means Old Private Mansion in the Old City, Owned and Used by a single family (family should be living there). The word haveli is derived from Arabic hawali, meaning "partition" or "private space", popularised under the Mughal Empire, and was devoid of any architectural affiliations. Later, the word haveli came to be used as a generic term for various styles of regional mansions, manor houses, townhouse found in the Indian subcontinent.

History

Origin 

The term Haveli originates from Arabic word hawali, meaning "partition" or "private space", term which was popularized under Mughal Empire. Early Havelis served Muslim rulers of the Indian Subcontinent and became an important architectural component of urban environments under the Mughals. Although Havelis originate from Indo-Islamic architecture, the existence of multistory homes and courtyards in the region is claimed as early as 3300 BCE. Courtyards are a common feature traditional houses in the Indian subcontinent with early examples dating back to neolithic period, whether they are mansions or farmhouses. These, however, employ very different architectural styles from traditional Havelis that were developed under Muslim rule with blend of local traditions and Islamic traditions. Traditional homes in the Indian subcontinent are built around a courtyard, and all family activities revolved around this chowk or courtyard. Additionally, the courtyard serves as a lightwell and helps ventilate the house in the hot and dry climates of the region.

During the medieval period, the term Haveli was also applied by some Vaishnava sects to refer to their temples in Gujarat under the Mughal Empire and Rajputana kingdoms. The generic term haveli eventually came to be identified with townhouses and mansions of the merchant class.

Characteristics

 Sociocultural aspects: The chowk or courtyard served as the centre for various ceremonies and rituals. The sacred tulsi plant was placed here and worshipped daily to bring prosperity to the house. 
 Security and privacy: The chowk, at times, separated areas for men and women, and provided them with privacy. 
 Climate: Using open space in the building design to respond to the local climate, air movement caused by temperature differences assists in the natural ventilation of the building.
 Different activities at different times: In the daytime, the court was used mostly by women to carry out their work and interact with other women in a private open space. Mansions of the merchant class often had more than one courtyard.
 Articulation of space: In Mor chowk, part of the City Palace complex in Udaipur, there is the concept of the courtyard as a dancing hall. Similarly, in havelis, a courtyard has several functions, commonly used for weddings and festive occasions.
 Materials: bricks, sandstone, marble, wood, plaster, and granite are commonly used materials. Decorative aspects are influenced by various local cultures and traditions.

All these elements join to form an enclosure and give the chowk a composed, secured feel. The architectural form of havelis has evolved in response to the climate, lifestyle, and availability of material. In hot climates where cooling is a necessity, buildings with internal courtyards for airflow and cooling were considered the most appropriate; in rainy places the houses were built to be kept dry from humid air. It provided shade while also allowing light inside. The arcade along the court, or the high wall around it, kept the interiors cool.

Many of the havelis of India and Pakistan were influenced by Rajasthani architecture. They usually contain a courtyard, often with a fountain in the center. The old cities of Agra, Lucknow, Jaisalmer and Delhi in India and Lahore, Multan, Peshawar, Hyderabad in Pakistan have many fine examples of Rajasthani-style havelis. Havelis in Nepal were built in the Newari architectural style; houses in old markets and bazaars in Kathmandu, Kritipur, Bhakthapur and Patan are built in this style.

Notable havelis by country

India 

In the northern part of India, havelis for Lord Krishna with huge mansion-like constructions are prevalent. These havelis are noted for their frescoes depicting images of gods, goddesses, animals, scenes from the British colonization, and the life stories of Lords Rama and Krishna. The music here was known as Haveli Sangeet.

Later on, these temple architectures and frescoes were imitated while building huge individual mansions and now the word is popularly associated with the mansions themselves. Between 1830 and 1930, Marwaris erected buildings in their homeland Shekhawati and Marwar. These buildings were called havelis. The Marwaris commissioned artists to paint those buildings, which were heavily influenced by the Mughal architecture. Nangal Sirohi in Mahendragarh district, 130 km from Delhi, is popular for its havelis and architecture within NCR.

The havelis served as status symbols for the Marwaris as well as homes for their extended families, providing security and comfort in seclusion from the outside world. The havelis were designed to be closed from all sides with one large main gate.

The typical havelis in Shekhawati incorporated two courtyards — an outer one for the men which served as an extended threshold, and the inner one, the domain of the women. The largest havelis could have up to three or four courtyards and were two to three stories high. Most of the havelis are empty nowadays or are maintained by a watchman, while others have been converted into hotels and tourist attractions.

The towns and villages of Shekhawati are famous for the embellished frescoes on the walls of their grandiose havelis, to the point of becoming popular tourist attractions.

The havelis in and around Jaisalmer Fort (also known as the Golden Fort), situated in Jaisalmer, Rajasthan, of which the three most impressive are Patwon Ki Haveli, Salim Singh Ki Haveli, and Nathmal-Ki Haveli, deserve special mention. These were the elaborate homes of Jaisalmer's rich merchants. The ostentatious carvings, etched in sandstone with great detail and then painstakingly pieced together in lavish patterns, were commissioned to put on show the owner's status and wealth. Around Jaisalmer, they are typically carved from yellow sandstone. They are often characterized by wall paintings, frescoes, jharokhas (balconies) and archways.

The Patwon Ji ki Haveli was the first erected in Jaisalmer. It is not a single haveli but a cluster of five small havelis. The first in the row is the most popular, and is also known as Kothari's Patwa Haveli. Commissioned and constructed in the year 1805 by Guman Chand Patwa, then a rich trader of jewellery and fine brocades, it is the biggest and the most ostentatious of the five. Patwa was a rich man and a renowned trader of his time and he could afford and thus order the construction of separate stories for each of his five sons. These were completed in a span of 50 years. All five houses were constructed in the first 60 years of the 19th century.
Patwon Ji Ki is renowned for its ornate wall paintings, intricate yellow sandstone-carved jharokhas (balconies), gateways and archways. Although the building itself is made from yellow sandstone, the main gateway is brown. Another notable haveli is Seth ji ri Haveli in Udaipur city; now known as Shree Jagdish Mahal, it is 250 years old.

Pakistan

A number of historically and architecturally significant havelis survive in Pakistan, most of which are situated in the Punjab province. The most significant in Lahore, the Haveli of Nau Nihal Singh, dates from the Sikh era of the mid-19th century, and is considered to be one of the finest examples of Sikh architecture in Lahore. It is the only Sikh-era haveli that preserves its original ornamentation and architecture.

Some other historically and architecturally significant havelis in Pakistan:
 Kapoor Haveli in Peshawar
 Choona Mandi Haveli in Lahore
 Fakir Khana Haveli and Museum in Lahore
 Haveli Asif Jah in Lahore
 Haveli Awais Meer in Walled city Lahore
 Haveli Barood Khana in Lahore
 Haveli Rani Jindan at the Lahore Fort in Lahore
 Haveli Wajid Ali Shah in Lahore
 Kharak Singh Haveli at the Lahore Fort in Lahore
 Lal Haveli or Chandu Di Haveli in Lahore
 Mubarak Haveli in Lahore
 Haveli Man Singh in Jhelum
 Lal Haveli in Rawalpindi
 Saad Manzil in Kamalia
 Khan Club in Peshawar
 Janjua Haveli in Malowal, Gujrat, Pakistan
 Haveli Mubashar Ali Janjua in Matore, Kahuta, Rawalpindi
 Havelis of the Mann Sardars of Mughalchak in Mananwala, Sheikhupura

See also 

 Walled City of Lahore
 Old Delhi
 Sethi Mohallah
 Jharokha

References

House types
 
Mughal architecture elements
Rajasthani architecture
Tourism in Rajasthan
Architecture in Pakistan
Indian architectural history

he:הוואלי